Heisen Hower Izquierdo Rentería (born 13 January 1995) is a Colombian professional footballer who plays for Cortuluá as a midfielder.

Career
Born in Cali, Izquierdo has played for Cortuluá and Orsomarso.

Personal life
On 1 June 2018 Izquierdo was shot and injured during an attack at Cristian Alexis Borja's house, which saw his Cortuluá teammate Alejandro Peñaranda die.

References

1995 births
Living people
Colombian footballers
Cortuluá footballers
Orsomarso S.C. footballers
Categoría Primera A players
Categoría Primera B players
Association football midfielders
Footballers from Cali
Shooting survivors